Komarock is a neighbourhood in the Eastlands area of the city of Nairobi.

Location
It borders the Kayole slum.

Komarock is zoned as a commercial and residential neighbourhood. It is more of a lower middle class neighbourhood compared to the neighbouring slum of Kayole. The residential aspect is characterized by mixed housing developments, such as flats, maisonettes, bungalows, and condominiums.  Some of these developments form exclusive gated neighbourhoods.

As per the 2019 census, Komarock had a population of 65,145, with a population density of 21,196/km2 in a land area of 3.1km2.

References

 

Suburbs of Nairobi